Shahtut a town of Shangla District in Khyber Pakhtunkhwa province of  Pakistan.

References

Cities and towns in Shangla District